The Anatomy Of is a studio album by American progressive metal band Between the Buried and Me. It is the second release to include Dan Briggs, Blake Richardson, and Dustie Waring and consists entirely of cover songs by Between the Buried and Me's favorite bands and musical inspirations.

The band stays close to the original style of each song, resulting in an album of widely varying genres.

Track listing

Chart positions

Personnel

Between the Buried and Me
Tommy Giles Rogers – vocals, keyboards
Paul Waggoner – guitars, vocals on track 10
Dan Briggs – bass
Dustie Waring – guitars
Blake Richardson – drums, percussion

Production and art
Jamie King – production, mixing, mastering
Paul Friemel – art direction, layout, illustration

References

Between the Buried and Me albums
2006 albums
Victory Records albums
Covers albums
Albums produced by Jamie King (record producer)